Larry Rodriguez may refer to:

 Larry Rodriguez (basketball) (born 1983), Filipino basketball player
 Larry Seilhamer Rodríguez (born 1954), Puerto Rican politician
 Larry Rodriguez, cameraman who made an official complaint of assault against baseball player Kenny Rogers